Mercadet or Le faiseur is a 1936 French comedy film directed by André Hugon and starring Paul Pauley, Janine Borelli and Philippe Janvier. It was based on an 1848 play by Honoré de Balzac.

Cast
 Paul Pauley as Monsieur Mercadet  
 Janine Borelli as Miss Julie Mercadet  
 Philippe Janvier as La Brive  
 Alexandre Mihalesco as Violette  
 Elmire Vautier as Madame Mercadet  
 Armand Larcher as Adolphe Minard  
 Jean Toulout as Berchut 
 Georges Bever 
 Jean Diéner 
 Albert Gercourt 
 Irène Jeanning 
 Jean Kolb 
 Germaine Michel 
 Emile Seylis

References

Bibliography 
 Crisp, Colin. Genre, Myth and Convention in the French Cinema, 1929-1939. Indiana University Press, 2002.

External links 
 

1936 comedy films
French comedy films
1936 films
1930s French-language films
Films based on works by Honoré de Balzac
Films directed by André Hugon
French black-and-white films
1930s French films